The Graduate School of Law of the Pamantasan ng Lungsod ng Maynila is one of the eight graduate schools of the university. It was launched on July 7, 2004, at the Manila Hotel, with former Undersecretary of the Department of Justice, Atty. Ernesto L. Pineda, as its first dean. Currently, former Supreme Court's Second Division Chairman Justice Angelina G. Sandoval-Gutierrez sits as the dean of the Graduate School of Law.

Further reading
 Newspaper articles and supplements
 Pamantasan ng Lungsod ng Maynila: A Quality University with A National Presence. The Manila Bulletin. July 31, 2006.

Graduate School of Law
Law schools in the Philippines
Graduate schools in the Philippines